"The People of Sand and Slag" is a science fiction novelette  by American writer Paolo Bacigalupi, first published in 2004. It was nominated for the 2005 Hugo Award for Best Novelette, the 2006 Nebula Award for Best Novelette and the 2005 Locus Poll.

On October 30, 2012, "The Drabblecast" podcast presented an audio dramatization by Norm Sherman, David Robison, Naomi Mercer and Mike Boris.

Plot summary
The story follows three genetically modified humans who work as guards for a large mining conglomeration in a far future Montana.  It begins with the three of them being called out to track down an intruder on their employer's property.  When they finally corner it they realize it is nothing more than a dog.  Fascinated by the fact that it could still survive in their day and age they decide to keep it as a pet, and then constantly struggle to keep it fed, clean, healthy and alive.

Footnotes

External links
The People of Sand and Slag at author's web site

Science fiction short stories
2004 short stories
Works originally published in The Magazine of Fantasy & Science Fiction
Biopunk novels
2000s science fiction works